Tricin synthase (ROMT-17, ROMT-15, HvOMT1, ZmOMT1) is an enzyme with systematic name S-adenosyl-L-methionine:tricetin 3',5'-O-dimethyltransferase. This enzyme catalyses the following chemical reaction

 2 S-adenosyl-L-methionine + tricetin  2 S-adenosyl-L-homocysteine + 3',5'-O-dimethyltricetin (overall reaction)
(1a) S-adenosyl-L-methionine + tricetin  S-adenosyl-L-homocysteine + 3'-O-methyltricetin
(1b) S-adenosyl-L-methionine + 3'-O-methyltricetin  S-adenosyl-L-homocysteine + 3',5'-O-dimethyltricetin

The enzymes from Oryza sativa (ROMT-15 and ROMT-17) catalyses the stepwise methylation of tricetin to its 3'-mono- and 3',5'-dimethyl ethers.

References

External links 
 

EC 2.1.1
Flavones metabolism